The 1945 Missouri Tigers football team was an American football team that represented the University of Missouri in the Big Six Conference (Big 6) during the 1945 college football season. The team compiled a 6–4 record (5–0 against Big 6 opponents), won the Big 6 championship, lost to Texas in the 1946 Cotton Bowl Classic, and was outscored by all opponents by a combined total of 174 to 170. Chauncey Simpson was the head coach for the third of three seasons. The team played its home games at Memorial Stadium in Columbia, Missouri.

The team's leading scorers were Loyd Brinkman and Robert Hopkins, each with 30 points.

Schedule

References

Missouri
Missouri Tigers football seasons
Big Eight Conference football champion seasons
Missouri Tigers football